Saladin (Arabic: صلاح الدين Ṣalāḥ ad-Dīn) is an animated project inspired by the life Salah Al-Din Yusuf Ibni Ayub, the Islamic hero who united Muslims in the holy war against the Crusaders in the 12th century. The series was conceived and produced by the Multimedia Development Corporation in Malaysia.  It was a 13-part animated TV series. Production started in May 2004 and a six-minute trailer was previewed during the Multimedia Super Corridor’s 10th Anniversary celebration in April 2005. The first (new) episode aired in late 2009.

See also
 List of Islamic films
 List of animated Islamic films

References
 MDeC official website

Television series about Islam
Islamic animated films
Malaysian children's animated adventure television series
Computer-animated films
Cultural depictions of Saladin
Animation based on real people

pt:Saladino (série animada)